Francesco Beccaruzzi (c. 1492–1562) was an Italian painter of the Renaissance era, active near his hometown of Conegliano and in the neighborhood of Treviso. He was influenced by both Il Pordenone and later Titian. He painted Saint Francis receiving stigmata (1545) from Conegliano, but now in the Gallerie dell'Accademia in Venice.

Works
St Mark with Saints Leonard and Catherine of Alexandria, altarpiece in Duomo of Conegliano
St Francis receives stigmata, with saints, altarpiece in the Duomo of Conegliano
Resurrection,  fresco in parrocchial church of Campolongo (Conegliano) 
Saints Peter, Paul, Sebastian, Roch, Catherine of Alexandria, and John, with Saints Giustina  and Catherine of Alexandria, altarpiede in the church of Santa Giustina di San Fior di Sotto
Madonna col Bambino enthroned with Saints John the Baptist and Francis Church of Santa Maria delle Grazie, Conegliano 
Meeting of Gioacchino and Anne, Duomo of Castelfranco Veneto 
 Saints Peter, Paul, Sebastian, Roch, Catherine of Alexandria, and John the in trono tra sant'Elena and St Titian, (1545), Parrocchial Church of San Elena in Scomigo 
Madonna and child with Saints Peter, Paul, Sebastian, Roch, Catherine of Alexandria, and John the Baptist (1540), Parrocchial Church of Mareno di Piave

References

1490s births
1562 deaths
16th-century Italian painters
Italian male painters
Italian Renaissance painters
People from Conegliano